West Lynn railway station served the area of West Lynn, Norfolk, England, from 1866 to 1886 on the Lynn and Sutton Bridge Railway.

History
The station was opened on 1 March 1866 by the Lynn and Sutton Bridge Railway. It closed on 1 July 1886.

References

Disused railway stations in Norfolk
Railway stations in Great Britain opened in 1866
Railway stations in Great Britain closed in 1886
1866 establishments in England
1886 disestablishments in England